Cherry Valley is a census-designated place (CDP) in Riverside County, California, United States. The population was 6,362 at the 2010 census, up from 5,891 at the 2000 census. It is situated at the most northwestern point of the San Gorgonio Pass.

The area was planted with many cherry trees, for which Cherry Valley was named. While many of the trees have long since been removed and replaced with homes, a few can still be spotted in backyards throughout the area.

History
In the early 1800s, the area was known as Rancho San Gorgonio, an outpost for the San Gabriel Mission. A large portion of the area was a Spanish Land Grant made to a man by the name of Paulino Weaver. In 1853, Weaver sold some of his land to Dr. Isaac William Smith, who was struck by the land's natural beauty while looking for stray cattle. Dr. Smith purchased a 1,000 acres for $1,000 from Weaver and established Smith Ranch and Highland Springs Ranch & Inn. The original Smith residence stood near where the swimming pool is today. In 1862, Smith's ranch was dubbed "Smith Station" and was made a stagecoach stop. In 1865, a young Wyatt Earp drove the route from San Bernardino to La Paz, Arizona on which Smith Station was a popular stop.

From 1864 to 1866, the route through Highland Springs along the Bradshaw Trail was the single connecting line for passenger, mail and the express travel between Southern California and the eastern regions of the nation. Smith's Station slowly developed into a hotel bustling with traffic. In 1884, the Smith property was purchased by a Los Angeles company that built a three-story hotel on the property called Highland Home. The first cherry trees in the area were planted here, contributing to the name that it is still known by today.

In 1927, Fred and William Hirsch bought the old Smith place, renamed it Highland Springs Resort, and developed it into a health resort. Fred Hirsch himself was made healthy through following the philosophy of Professor Arnold Ehret, who was an early proponent of juice fasting and colon cleansing. The restaurant on the resort was vegetarian and Hirsch grew a lot of the produce served at the restaurant on the property. He also grew his own grapes and operated a small vineyard. The resort became known as "The Last Resort" as many sick people who were not able to get well with traditional methods, were able to recover through Hirsch's health practices while staying at the resort. From 1941 to 1945 there was a large World War 2 medical treatment facility at the site:Cherry Valley Hospital.

Geography
Cherry Valley is located at  (33.974848, -116.970300).

With an elevation of 2,980 feet above sea level, Cherry Valley is at the highest point on the San Gorgonio Pass between San Bernardino and Palm Springs.

Climate
According to the Köppen Climate Classification system, Cherry Valley has a hot-summer Mediterranean climate, abbreviated "Csa" on climate maps.

Demographics

2010
At the 2010 census Cherry Valley had a population of 6,362. The racial makeup of Cherry Valley was 5,450 (85.7%) White (73.5% Non-Hispanic White), 63 (1.0%) African American, 102 (1.6%) Native American, 87 (1.4%) Asian, 4 (0.1%) Pacific Islander, 451 (7.1%) from other races, and 205 (3.2%) from two or more races. Hispanic or Latino of any race were 1,347 persons (21.2%).

The census reported that 6,203 people (97.5% of the population) lived in households, 98 (1.5%) lived in non-institutionalized group quarters, and 61 (1.0%) were institutionalized.

There were 2,612 households, 540 (20.7%) had children under the age of 18 living in them, 1,375 (52.6%) were opposite-sex married couples living together, 236 (9.0%) had a female householder with no husband present, 98 (3.8%) had a male householder with no wife present. There were 115 (4.4%) unmarried opposite-sex partnerships, and 16 (0.6%) same-sex married couples or partnerships. 769 households (29.4%) were one person and 500 (19.1%) had someone living alone who was 65 or older. The average household size was 2.37. There were 1,709 families (65.4% of households); the average family size was 2.89.

The age distribution was 1,057 people (16.6%) under the age of 18, 448 people (7.0%) aged 18 to 24, 1,039 people (16.3%) aged 25 to 44, 1,967 people (30.9%) aged 45 to 64, and 1,851 people (29.1%) who were 65 or older. The median age was 51.9 years. For every 100 females, there were 90.7 males.  For every 100 females age 18 and over, there were 90.0 males.

There were 2,874 housing units at an average density of 355.4 per square mile, of the occupied units 2,098 (80.3%) were owner-occupied and 514 (19.7%) were rented. The homeowner vacancy rate was 4.4%; the rental vacancy rate was 5.5%. Of the population 4,853 people (76.3%) lived in owner-occupied housing units and 1,350 people (21.2%) lived in rental housing units.

According to the 2010 United States Census, Cherry Valley had a median household income of $54,929, with 7.2% of the population living below the federal poverty line.

2000
At the 2000 census there were 5,891 people, 2,434 households, and 1,740 families in the CDP. A law was passed in which there could only be 1 house per acre. The racial makeup of the CDP was 80.1% White, 0.1% Black or African American, 2.2% Native American, 2.1% Asian, 2.2% Pacific Islander, 4.3% from other races, and 2.5% from two or more races. 13.4% of the population were Hispanic or Latino of any race.
Of the 2,434 households 20.1% had children under the age of 18 living with them, 61.8% were married couples living together, 6.5% had a female householder with no husband present, and 28.5% were non-families. Of all households 24.5% were one person and 15.7% were one person aged 65 or older. The average household size was 2.4 and the average family size was 2.8.

The age distribution was 18.8% under the age of 18, 5.7% from 18 to 24, 18.9% from 25 to 44, 26.8% from 45 to 64, and 29.8% 65 or older. The median age was 50 years. For every 100 females, there were 92.5 males. For every 100 females age 18 and over, there were 90.5 males.

The median household income was $39,199 and the median family income  was $45,777. Males had a median income of $37,281 versus $29,561 for females. The per capita income for the CDP was $21,669. About 3.3% of families and 5.8% of the population were below the poverty line, including 6.4% of those under age 18 and 5.7% of those age 65 or over.

Cherry Valley unsuccessfully attempted to incorporate into a city in the 1990s and early 2000s.

Government

Infrastructure

Parks and recreation
Parks and recreational activities are provided by the Beaumont-Cherry Valley Recreation and Park District.

Points of interest
Edward-Dean Museum & Gardens, features late 16th to early 19th century European & Asian Decorative Arts.

References

External links
San Gorgonio Pass Historical Society

Census-designated places in Riverside County, California
Census-designated places in California
San Gorgonio Pass